Thomas Michael Sullivan is an actor, producer, and founding member of Stage13. He is executive producer of The Deertrees Theatre Festival now in its 10th year, bringing New York productions to the Lakes Region of Maine every August. Thomas has produced over 30 Equity showcases. Off-Broadway production credits include The Voyage of the Carcass by Dan O'Brien. In 2008, he joined as executive producer with London producers Rotozazza and The Foundry Theatre NYC to present Etiquette as part of The Public Theater’s Under the Radar Festival.  He started Studio13, a film production company, about to release the9tthdot, an interactive web series, and Hysterical Psycho, a feature horror film written and directed by Dan Fogler.  He originated and still produces "...a little bit louder", a weekly NYC poetry series that has won two National Slam Championships.

Theater 

 American Clock by Arthur Miller
 Sight Unseen by Donald Marguiles
 Dr. Cooks Garden by Ira Levin
 Misery by Stephen King
 Someone Who'll Watch Over Me by Franj McGuinnes
 Cobb by Lee Blessing
 Line by Israel Horovitz
 Brilliant Traces by Cindy Lou Johnson
 Danny & The Deep Blue Seas by John Patrick Shanley
 Nuts & Bolts
 Love Letters by A.R. Gurney
 Sean in Kylenamoe
 Spare Tongues
 Voyage of the Carcass by Dan O'Brien

Filmography

Production 
 Deertrees Theatre Festival
 Stage13
 Greenlight TheatreWorks
 13th Street Repertory
 LoveCreek Productions

References

External links 
 

American film producers
American male actors
Living people
Year of birth missing (living people)